Adriano Bassetto (8 September 1925 – 11 October 1999) was an Italian footballer who played as an attacking midfielder.

Career
Bassetto was born in Vicenza, Veneto. An attacking midfielder, he played most of his career with Sampdoria and Atalanta in Serie A between 1946 and 1957. He also played for Siena, Vicenza, Lucchese and Cesena. In total, he scored 149 goals in 329 appearances in Serie A.

1925 births
1999 deaths
Sportspeople from Vicenza
Italian footballers
Italy international footballers
Serie A players
Serie B players
Serie C players
A.C.N. Siena 1904 players
L.R. Vicenza players
U.C. Sampdoria players
Atalanta B.C. players
S.S.D. Lucchese 1905 players
A.C. Cesena players
Association football midfielders
Footballers from Veneto